Matthias Mink (born 31 July 1967) is a German former professional footballer who played as a defender. He manages SC Fortuna Köln II.

References

1967 births
Living people
German footballers
SC Fortuna Köln players
Association football defenders
2. Bundesliga players
German football managers
SC Fortuna Köln managers
KSV Hessen Kassel managers
FC 08 Homburg managers